Lumen Christi Catholic School is a private Roman Catholic high school located in Summit Township, just outside Jackson, Michigan, in the United States.  Located in the Roman Catholic Diocese of Lansing, it was established in 1968 from the merger of St. Mary's and St. John's Catholic High Schools.

History 
Lumen Christi Catholic High School was opened in 1968 as a result of merging St. John and St. Mary High Schools. Lumen Christi is under the direction of the Bishop of Lansing, through the Diocesan Board of Education, and advised by the Policy Committee and the Financial Planning Committee.  It is supported and maintained by the following local Catholic Parishes: St. John the Evangelist/St. Joseph Parish, St. Mary Star of the Sea/St. Stanislaus Kostka Parish, Queen of the Miraculous Medal Parish, Our Lady of Fatima Parish in Michigan Center, St Rita Parish in Clarklake, St. Catherine Laboure Parish in Concord, and St. John the Evangelist Parish in Albion. The total area of the school encompasses 172,700 square feet.  A Resource Center and Library with seating capacity of 265 is located in the center of the school.  The 180-foot diameter domed gymnasium seats 3000 people for athletic and community events along with a wrestling and weight room. The cafetorium (combined cafeteria and auditorium) with complete kitchen facilities, accommodates 500 for dining and approximately 700 for assemblies or other social functions. The chapel is used for daily mass and special masses and services.

Jackson Catholic Middle School moved to Lumen Christi's campus at the start of the 2014–2015 school year. With the move, the school is divided into two wings, one for Lumen Christi and the other for JCMS, with the cafetorium, choir room, band room, and gymnasiums shared.

Demographics

When the high school opened in 1968, it was designed to accommodate over 1,000 students. At that time, the total enrollment of the high school and middle school was nearly 1,700.

As of the 2019–2020 academic year, the enrollment of the high school was 307, and the total enrollment of the middle school was 140, with the following demographic breakdown of the total enrollment of 447:

Asian/Pacific islander – 0.67% (3) 
Black – 2.68% (12) 
Hispanic – 7.60% (34)
Native American – 1.12% (5) 
White – 83% (371) 
Multiracial – 4.92% (22)

Academics 
Lumen Christi currently offers six Advanced Placement (AP) courses: AP Calculus, AP Language, AP Literature, AP Government, AP Chemistry, and AP US History.

Athletics

The athletic teams are known as the Titans and are members of the Interstate 8 Athletic Conference for all sports. The Titans have a total of 44 state championships in nine sports. The following MHSAA sanctioned sports are offered:

Baseball (boys)
State champs – 1978, 2015
Basketball (boys & girls)
Bowling (boys & girls)
Competitive cheerleading (girls)
Cross country (boys & girls)
Boys state champs – 1979, 2012
Girls state champs – 1982, 1983, 1984, 1986, 1990, 1991, 2006, 2007, 2012
Football (boys)
State champs – 1977, 1979, 1996, 2000, 2001, 2003, 2004, 2009, 2016, 2017, 2018, 2021
Golf (boys & girls)
Boys state champs – 1978, 1979, 1981, 1982, 1983, 1984, 1985, 1986, 1990, 1991, 2009, 2010, 2011, 2012, 2017
Girls state champs – 1989, 1992, 1995, 2003, 2004
Gymnastics (girls)
Ice hockey (boys)
State champs – 1977, 1978
Soccer (boys & girls)
Boys state champs – 2003 (tied)
Softball (girls)
Swim & dive (boys & girls)
Tennis (boys & girls)
Track and field (boys & girls)
Boys state champs – 2015
Volleyball (girls)
Wrestling (boys)

James Francis Rapp

In 2015, James Francis Rapp was charged by the Michigan Attorney General with 13 counts of criminal sexual conduct for crimes he committed while a priest, teacher, maintenance supervisor and wrestling coach at Lumen Christi from 1980 to 1986. At the time the Michigan charges were filed, Rapp was already serving a 40-year sentence for similar crimes in Oklahoma. Rapp pleaded no contest to 3 counts of first degree criminal sexual conduct and 3 counts of second degree criminal sexual conduct in return for the other charges being dropped. He was sentenced to an additional 20–40 years in prison by the Michigan court on top of the Oklahoma sentence. At the sentencing hearing, victims testified that they attempted to report the abuse at the time to Fr. Joseph Coyle, the original principal of the high school, but Coyle insisted that they do so in confession rather than in a formal hearing or office meeting. Coyle then admonished  them that what was said in confession could not be repeated and that they would "go to hell" if they did so.  Coyle did not report the abuse to authorities, but Rapp was quietly transferred. Rapp was sent to a month-long evaluation at the Saint Luke Institute, which concluded: 

Afterwards, he was transferred to other parishes, including the Oklahoma parish were he committed the later crimes. In the wake of the revelation of Coyle's complicity in Rapp's crimes, Coyle's name was removed from the fundraising charity for the school, the Fr. Coyle Society, out of consideration for Rapp's victims.

Notable alumni
Ryan LaMarre baseball player
Dominic Pangborn artist and graphic designer
Khari Willis football player

References

External links
 Official Lumen Christi Website
 Jackson Area Catholic Schools Website

Roman Catholic Diocese of Lansing
Catholic secondary schools in Michigan
Schools in Jackson County, Michigan
Educational institutions established in 1968
1968 establishments in Michigan
Catholic Church sexual abuse scandals